Miryalaguda is a city in Nalgonda district of the Indian state of Telangana. In 2015, the Government of India placed Miryalaguda under the Atal Mission for Rejuvenation and Urban Transformation scheme.

Geography

Demographics 

In the 2011 Census of India, Miryalaguda had a population of 128,891.

Governance

Civic Administration 
Miryalaguda Municipality was constituted as a municipality in 1984 and is governed by the provisions of the 
Telangana State Municipalities Act, 1965 (Act). MLGM is grade-I municipality, which manages the civic services in 
Miryalaguda town, located in the state of Telangana (TS)

The city also Serves as headquarters of Miryalaguda mandal in the Miryalaguda revenue division

Transport

Road 
State highway 2 passes through Miryalaguda.

TSRTC operates buses from Miryalaguda to various destinations in the state.

Railway 
The railway station has three platforms and is situated on the Pagidipalli–Nallapadu section in Guntur Division. The Track was an electrified, single line. It was electrified in 2018–19. Pagidipalli-Nallapadu was electrified in 2019. The electric trains started service on 1 September 2019.

Air 

Rajiv Gandhi International Airport in Hyderabad is the nearest airport at a distance of 156 km by road. The other airport nearer to Miryalaguda is Vijayawada International Airport which is at a distance of 151 km by road.

See also
 Miryalaguda (Assembly constituency)
List of cities in Telangana by area
List of cities in Telangana by population
List of Smart and Amrut Cities in Telangana

List of cities in India by area
Thungapahad

References

Cities in Telangana
Municipalities of Telangana
Mandal headquarters in Nalgonda district